Filipe de Souza Conceicao (born 11 November 1995 in Brazil), is a former Brazilian-born Hong Kong professional footballer.

Early life
Filipe was born in Brazil in 1995. He is the son of ex-South China player Anílton da Conceição. Two years after he was born, his family moved to Hong Kong since Anílton da Conceição was pursuing his football career in Hong Kong.

Club career

South China
In 2011, Filipe joined South China's youth academy, also known as Wanchai South China.

2012–13 season
On 8 December 2012, Filipe was selected to the first team squad for friendly match against S.L. Benfica de Macau. Filipe was substituted in the second half of the friendly match. On 17 December 2012, about a week after he played his first match for the first team, he, alongside Kouta Jige, signed professional contracts with South China. Five days later, he made his debut for South China in the league match against Sun Pegasus at Yuen Long Stadium. He replaced goalscorer Cheng Lai Hin as an 86th-minute substitute.

Career statistics

Club
 As of 22 December 2012

References

1995 births
Living people
Association football forwards
Hong Kong footballers
Hong Kong First Division League players
Hong Kong people of Brazilian descent
South China AA players
Sun Hei SC players